Alpha is the second full-length studio album from visual kei rock band Alice Nine. It was released on the November 28th, 2007. Alpha includes 12 tracks, 4 of which were previously released as singles. Two versions of the album were released on the same day: one regular edition with only the CD, and one special edition with an exclusive DVD that includes two new music videos.
The song "Eraser" is also featured on the band's Mirror Ball single, albeit remade with a different arrangement and instrumental background.

Track listing

Videos From "Alpha"

"Cosmic World"
"Jewels"
"Number Six."
"White Prayer
"Eraser"
"Blue Planet"

References

2007 albums
Alice Nine albums
Alice Nine video albums
2007 video albums
Music video compilation albums
2007 compilation albums